Albert Ovsepyan (13 January 1938) is an Armenian-Abkhazian politician, a member of the People's Assembly of Abkhazia and a former Vice-Speaker of the Assembly.

Biography
Ovsepyan was born in Parnaut, a settlement in the Abkhaz Autonomous Soviet Socialist Republic. He graduated from Sukhumi Pedagogical Institute, spending most of his career as an educator. Ovsepyan was elected to the People's Assembly of Abkhazia at its thirteenth convocation. He became Vice-Speaker of the People's Assembly of Abkhazia in March 2006, replacing its previous vice-speaker, Alexander Stranichkin, who had nominated Ovsepyan.

On 3 May 2010, Ovsepyan retired from the post of Vice-Speaker on account of old age.

Notes

References

1938 births
Living people
3rd convocation of the People's Assembly of Abkhazia
Abkhaz Armenians
4th convocation of the People's Assembly of Abkhazia